Erling Martin Jonny Nilsson (9 February 1943 – 22 June 2022) was a Swedish competitive speed skater. He was the men's Olympic champion in the 10 000 m skating in 1964.

Biography

Aged 19 Nilsson made his international debut at the European Allround Championships in 1962, finishing 15th. Nilsson had trouble with the 500 m, which clearly showed at the World Allround Championships two weeks later – despite a 1st place on the 10,000 m and a 2nd place on the 5000 m, he finished only 10th overall because he had finished the 500 m in 45th place. For his accomplishments, Nilsson received the 1962 Oscar Mathisen Award. The next year at the World Allround Championships, he finished 23rd on the 500 m, but with a 6th place on the 1500 m and wins on both the 5,000 m and the 10000 m (both in new world record times), he made up his deficit and became World Allround Champion with a new world record samalog for the combination of the four distances.

At the 1964 Winter Olympics in Innsbruck, Nilsson was still the world record holder on both the 5000 m and the 10000 m, but he finished only 6th on the 5000 m. Two days later, though, he became Olympic Champion on the 10000 m. In 1965, Nilsson finished 4th at the World Allround Championships, despite winning both the 5000 m (in a new world record time) and the 10000 m. His last international medal came the following year at the 1966 World Allround Championships, where he won bronze. He participated in the 5000 m and the 10000 m at the 1968 Winter Olympics in Grenoble, but did not win any medals.

Besides his international successes, Nilsson won many national titles. He was Swedish Allround Champion four times (1964–1967) and won a total of 13 Swedish Single Distance Championships – twice on the 1,500 m (1966–1967), five times on the 5,000 m (1962–1966), and six times on the 10,000 m (1963–1968).

Nilsson earned the Svenska Dagbladet Gold Medal in 1963. He was not related to his speed skating rival Ivar Nilsson.

Nilsson died on 22 June 2022 at the age of 79.

Records

World records 
Over the course of his career, Nilsson skated five world records:

Source: SpeedSkatingStats.com

Personal records 

Nilsson was number one on the Adelskalender, the all-time allround speed skating ranking, for a total of 329 days, from February 1963 to January 1964. He has an Adelskalender score of 176.873 points.

References

Notes

Bibliography

 Eng, Trond. All Time International Championships, Complete Results: 1889 – 2002. Askim, Norway: WSSSA-Skøytenytt, 2002.
 Nilsson, Jonny. Sikta mot stjärnorna.... Filipstad, Sweden: Filipstads Tryckeri Förlag, 1963.
 Teigen, Magne. Komplette Resultater Internasjonale Mesterskap 1889 – 1989: Menn/Kvinner, Senior/Junior, allround/sprint. Veggli, Norway: WSSSA-Skøytenytt, 1989.

External links

 Jonny Nilsson at SpeedSkatingStats.com
 Personal records from the Adelskalender

1943 births
2022 deaths
Swedish male speed skaters
Olympic speed skaters of Sweden
Speed skaters at the 1964 Winter Olympics
Speed skaters at the 1968 Winter Olympics
Olympic gold medalists for Sweden
World record setters in speed skating
Olympic medalists in speed skating
Medalists at the 1964 Winter Olympics
World Allround Speed Skating Championships medalists
Sportspeople from Gothenburg
Deaths from prostate cancer